The 1995 Australian Sports Sedan Championship was a CAMS sanctioned Australian motor racing title for Group 2D Sports Sedans. The title, which was the 11th Australian Sports Sedan Championship, was won by Cameron McLean driving a Greenfield Mowers Racing BMW M3.

Calendar
The championship was contested over a four round series.

Championship results

Note: Only the top four championship positions are shown in the above table.

References

National Sports Sedan Series
Sports Sedan Championship